Blair Romero Cobbs (born December 30, 1989) is an American professional boxer who has held the WBC-NABF welterweight title since 2019.

Early life
Blair Romero Cobbs was born on December 30, 1989, in Philadelphia, Pennsylvania. He moved with his mother from city to city until his mother died when he was eleven years old, at which time he moved in with his grandmother. Following his grandmother's death he lived with his father, Eugene Cobbs, eventually relocating to Guadalajara, Mexico, after his father became a fugitive from the FBI. It was in Guadalajara where Cobbs found boxing.

Professional career
Cobbs made his professional debut on June 28, 2013, scoring a first-round knockout (KO) victory over Martique Holland at Lera's Baile Mexicano in Ruffin, North Carolina.

After compiling a record of 9–0–1 (6 KOs) he faced Ferdinand Kerobyan for the vacant WBC-NABF Junior welterweight title on March 21, 2019, at The Avalon in Los Angeles, California. Kerobyan suffered a cut in the first round from an accidental clash of heads, which Cobbs targeted with sharp jabs. With Cobbs' hand speed being the decisive factor, he went on to win by unanimous decision (UD) to capture his first professional title. One judge scored the bout 79–73 and the other two scored it 77–75. 

After a sixth-round knockout (KO) victory against Robert Redmond Jr. in a non-title bout in June, Cobbs made the first defence of his title against Steve Villalobos on August 22 at the Fantasy Springs Resort Casino in Indio, California. After an even back-and-forth fight for the first five rounds, Cobbs suffered the first knockdown of his career in the sixth after being stunned by a right followed by a flurry of punches to send him to the canvas. After taking control in rounds seven and eight, Cobbs ended the fight in the ninth after landing a series of uppercuts followed by a right hand to send Villalobos stumbling into the ropes and onto the canvas, giving Cobbs the KO win.

His next fight came against Carlos Cervantes for the vacant WBC-NABF welterweight title on November 2, 2019, at the MGM Grand Garden Arena in Paradise, Nevada. The bout served as part of the undercard for Canelo Álvarez vs. Sergey Kovalev. After suffering a knockdown in the first round – a punch from Villalobos grazed the back of Cobbs' head, causing him to stumble and touch the canvas with his left hand and knee – Cobbs scored a knockdown of his own in the sixth with a counter left hook. Cervantes made it to his feet to see out the remainder of the round, only for his corner to pull him out of the contest before the start of the seventh, handing Cobbs a stoppage win via seventh-round corner retirement (RTD).

The first defense of his newly acquired title came on February 14, 2020, against Samuel Kotey Neequaye at the Honda Center in Anaheim, California. In a fight which saw Cobbs stay behind the jab and box at range, he received a point deduction in round nine for punching below the belt en route to a split decision (SD) victory. Two judges scored the bout 96–93 in favour of Cobbs while the third scored it 95–94 to Neequaye.

Professional boxing record

References

External links
BBC podcast Lives Less Ordinary 13 February 2023 part 1: 40 minutes

Living people
1989 births
American male boxers
Welterweight boxers
Boxers from Philadelphia
Southpaw boxers